Xələc (also, Israfilbeyli, Khaladzh, and Novo-Khaladzh) is a village and municipality in the Salyan Rayon of Azerbaijan.  It has a population of 3,072.

References 

Populated places in Salyan District (Azerbaijan)